Pa Joseph Ladipo (10 July 1941 – 9 May 2013) was a Nigerian footballer and manager.

Career
During his playing career, Ladipo played for Shooting Stars until 1973. Upon his retirement, he became the club's assistant manager, before being promoted to the first team coach in 1977. From 1982 to 1988, he was the manager of Leventis United. He then returned to manage Shooting Stars from 1990 to 1992.

Ladipo was the head coach of the Nigeria women's national team at the 2008 Summer Olympics. He also led Nigeria to win the 2007 All-Africa Games, and finished third place at the 2008 African Women's Championship.

Personal life
Ladipo was born in Ibadan, and was nicknamed Jossy Lad. He died on 9 May 2013 at his home in Ibadan at the age of 71.

References

External links
 
 

1941 births
2013 deaths
Sportspeople from Ibadan
Nigerian footballers
Shooting Stars S.C. players
Nigerian football managers
Shooting Stars S.C. managers
Women's association football managers
Nigeria women's national football team managers
Leventis United F.C. managers
Association footballers not categorized by position